Little Matterhorn is a rocky peak,  high, formed by a small volcanic cone  north-northwest of Fremantle Peak, on the north flank of Big Ben, the dominating mountain on Heard Island. It was surveyed and named in 1948 by the Australian National Antarctic Research Expedition.

References

Volcanoes of Heard Island and McDonald Islands